The Virgin and Child with Saint John the Baptist and an Unidentified Saint, also called the Virgin with Saint John the Baptist, adored by a Donor, is a religious painting by Titian, dated to between 1515 and 1520, which is currently on loan to the Scottish National Gallery.

Analysis 
The picture has been called Palmesque, and Crowe and Cavalcaselle give it in their list of pictures ascribed to that painter. Morelli already acknowledged it as a genuine work by Titian in the late nineteenth century. According to Gronau, the picture is also very Giorgionesque, and therefore probably painted about 1510 to 1512, at about the same date as the Three Ages of Life. The Scottish National Gallery puts the date slightly later, about 1515 to 1520. It was originally a panel painting, but has been transferred to canvas. 

A replica, with Saint Catherine and Saint Jerome, by a pupil of Titian, is mentioned by Gronau in the Glasgow Corporation Galleries (no. 484) in 1904.

Provenance 

 Earl of Ellesmere, Bridgewater House, Westminster.
 Scottish National Gallery (Bridgewater Collection Loan).

References

Sources 

 Gronau, Georg (1904). Titian. London: Duckworth and Co; New York: Charles Scribner's Sons. p. 281.
 Ricketts, Charles (1910). Titian. London: Methuen & Co. Ltd. pp. 177, plate xx.
 "The Virgin and Child with St John the Baptist and an Unidentified Saint". National Galleries Scotland. Retrieved 7 March 2023.

Paintings of the Madonna and Child by Titian
1510s paintings